Nur Amalina Hayati (born December 15, 1995), known as Anya Geraldine,  is an Indonesian actress, internet celebrity, and model. Her career in entertainment began in 2016 as an internet celebrity and model. Anya made her acting debut in the horor film Tusuk Jelangkung di Lubang Buaya and first received recognition in the film Yowis Ben 2 and the web series Pretty Little Liars Indonesia. After that, she has starred in 8 feature films including Sabar Ini Ujian, Selesai and Garis Waktu.

Early life 
Geraldine was born Nur Amalina Hayati in Jakarta, Indonesia. The name was given by her mother who wanted an Islamic name while her father wanted her to be named Anya Geraldine. Because of that, she was called Anya since she was a child. Geraldine grew up in Cempaka Putih, Central Jakarta. At the age of five, her parents divorced. Then she lived with her mother and her younger brother. Anya attended SDI At-Taubah then continued to SMP Perguruan Cikini. She graduated from SMA Negeri 4 Jakarta majoring in Social Studies in 2013 and then entered Kalbis Institute.

Career 
Being a model is one of Geraldine's dreams from middle-school. Before being famous in entertainment, Geraldine has been active in modelling. She once attended a modeling school founded by Kimmy Jayanti, the Kimmy Jayanti School.

Geraldine began to be known to the public after uploading a vlog on her personal YouTube channel. Because of the video, she was called by the Indonesian Child Protection Commission (KPAI) for uploading her 'free' holiday style with her boyfriend. Since then she has been active as an internet celebrity. She has also received offers for advertisements, video clips and feature films.

In 2018, Geraldine began to widen her career by entering the world of film. She acted in her first film as Mayang in the horror film Tusuk Jelangkung di Lubang Buaya (2018) produced by Max Pictures.

In 2019, Geraldine acted in the Yowis Ben 2 (2019) directed by Bayu Skak and Fajar Nugros. She acted as Asih with Bayu as the main character. Since then, Geraldine has started playing many films and web series, one of which is Sabar Ini Ujian (2020), directed by Anggy Umbara and Pretty Little Liars (2020) directed by Emil Heradi. She admitted that she wanted to focus on her career in the acting world.

In 2020, Rizky Febian invited Geraldine to become a model for the video clip in the "Garis Cinta" trilogy. Her first video clip for song "Cuek", got 7 million views in ten days and made it to Indonesia's YouTube trending. After the success of the trilogy, she is rumored to be collaborating again with Rizky on a song.

Business 
Apart from a career in the entertainment world, Geraldine also has several businesses that she admits to work with her friends. Some of her businesses are engaged in culinary, cosmetics, and also E-cigarette fluids. She also claims to have catfish and duck farms.

Filmography

Film

Web series

Model video clips 
 Rizky Febian – "Cuek"
 Rizky Febian – "Mantra Cinta"
 Rizky Febian – "Makna Cinta"

Award and nomination

References

External links 
 
 
 

1995 births
21st-century Indonesian actresses
Actresses from Jakarta
Indonesian female models
Indonesian film actresses
Indonesian Internet celebrities
Living people